The Virgin Islands are an archipelago in the Caribbean Sea.

Virgin Islands or Virgin Island may also refer to:

Places

Virgin Islands
 British Virgin Islands, an overseas territory of the United Kingdom
 United States Virgin Islands, an unincorporated territory of the United States
 Danish Virgin Islands, a former Danish colony
 Spanish Virgin Islands or Passage Islands, politically part of Puerto Rico
 Dutch Virgin Islands, a Dutch colony from 1625–1680

Elsewhere
 Jomfruene (Norwegian for "the virgins"), a group of Subantarctic islands
 Île Vierge, islet with a lighthouse, off the north coast of Brittany, France
 Silion, an island in Cebu, Philippines
 Pungtud Island, more commonly known in Bohol as Virgin Island

Arts and entertainment
 Virgin Islands (album), 1983 album by Cusco, later released as Virgin Island
 L'Île vierge, 1897 work by Camille Lemonnier
 Virgin Island (film), a 1958 British film

See also
 Blue Virgin Isles, 1978 album by Ted Gärdestad
 Our Virgin Island, 1953 memoir by Robb White